The 1932–33 Rugby Union County Championship was the 40th edition of England's premier rugby union club competition at the time.

Hampshire won the competition for the first time after defeating Lancashire in the final.

Final

See also
 English rugby union system
 Rugby union in England

References

Rugby Union County Championship
County Championship (rugby union) seasons